Buhuși is a town in Bacău County, Romania with a population of 14,562 (2011). It was first mentioned in the 15th century when it was named "Bodești" and was a property of an important family of Boyars named "Buhuș".

The town had the biggest textile factory in south-eastern Europe. But the factory has drastically reduced its capabilities after 1989 and currently employs less than 200 workers.
The Runc Monastery (built in 1457), located near Buhuși, is one of the famous monasteries built by Stephen the Great of Moldavia in Moldavia during the Ottoman Wars in the 15th century.

Buhuși has five primary schools and one high school, the Ion Borcea Technical College. The town administers two villages, Marginea and Runcu.

Jewish community
Rabbi Yitzchok Friedman, son of Rabbi Yisrael Friedman of Ruzhin, founded the Bohush Hasidic dynasty here in the mid-nineteenth century. The dynasty moved to Tel Aviv, Israel, in 1951.

Notable residents 
 Elisabeta Bostan, film director and screenwriter
 Dumitru Dan, geographer, professor of geography and globe-trotter
 Yisrael Friedman, rabbi
 Mircea Grosaru, politician
 Marian Purică, football player
 Mihail Roller, communist activist, historian and propagandist
 Moshe Sharoni, Israeli politician

Gallery

References

External links 

Populated places in Bacău County
Localities in Western Moldavia
Towns in Romania
Monotowns in Romania